Kimsa Chata (Aymara and Quechua kimsa three, Pukina chata mountain, "three mountains", Hispanicized spelling Quimsa Chata) is a   mountain in the Andes of Bolivia. It is located in the Oruro Department, Sabaya Province, Sabaya Municipality, Negrillos Canton.

References 

Mountains of Oruro Department